The 1947 Alamo Bowl was a post-season college football bowl game in Texas between the Hardin–Simmons Cowboys and Denver Pioneers, played in San Antonio on January 4 at Alamo Stadium. Originally scheduled for New Year's Day, freezing temperatures and icy conditions postponed the game three days.

After a scoreless first quarter on a windy  Saturday afternoon, Hardin–Simmons shut out Denver 20–0. Poor attendance (3,730) caused the game to be a financial failure and was not scheduled again.

There is no relation between this game and the current Alamo Bowl, which began in 1993.

See also
 List of college bowl games

References

Alamo Bowl
Defunct college football bowls
Denver Pioneers football bowl games
Hardin–Simmons Cowboys football bowl games
Alamo Bowl